Qareh Quyunlu (also Romanized as Qareh Qūyūnlū, Qarah Qowyūnlū, and Qareh Qowyūnlū) is a village in Takab Rural District, in the Central District of Dargaz County, Razavi Khorasan Province, Iran. At the 2006 census, its population was 445, in 142 families.

References 

Populated places in Dargaz County